Bever railway station is a railway station in the municipality of Bever, in the Swiss canton of Graubünden. It is located at the junction of the  Albula and Bever–Scuol-Tarasp lines of the Rhaetian Railway. It is located to the southwest of the village of Bever at 1710 m above sea level. The station is normally served only by the passenger trains that operate on the Engadine line. The hourly Chur–St. Moritz Regional Express does not normally stop in Bever. Some early morning and late evening regional services on the Chur–St. Moritz route do stop.

Services
The following services stop at Bever:

 Regio:
 limited service between Chur and St. Moritz.

References

External links
 
 
 

Railway stations in Switzerland opened in 1903
Railway stations in Graubünden
Rhaetian Railway stations